Oakland Park, officially the City of Oakland Park, is a city in Broward County, Florida, United States. As of the 2020 United States Census, the city's population was 44,229. It is part of the Miami–Fort Lauderdale–West Palm Beach Metropolitan Statistical Area, which was home to 6,166,488 people at the 2020 census.

History

Originally named Floranada (a blend of Florida and Canada) and U-Turn City, the town was forced into bankruptcy after the hurricane of 1926. When the municipality reincorporated, residents chose to make it a city and voted for the name Oakland Park. The original boundaries went from the Atlantic Ocean, west to what is now U.S. 441, and from the north fork of Middle River north to Cypress Creek Boulevard, but when the boundaries were reestablished, it was to approximately the west side of U.S. 1, west to Northeast 3rd Avenue and the north fork of Middle River north to what is now Prospect Road. Over time, it has expanded to its current boundaries, mainly due to acquiring a few other areas, such as recent annexations of previously unincorporated neighborhoods of Twin Lakes South and North Andrews Gardens.

Geography

Oakland Park is located at  (26.176362, –80.144509).

Oakland Park is bisected by the Florida East Coast Railway, which runs parallel to Dixie Highway through the city's downtown. The City of Oakland Park has put into place new zoning regulations intended to transform downtown Oakland Park into a mixed-use pedestrian community.  One element of the proposal is the creation of a new commuter rail station on the FEC rail line.

Oakland Park borders the city of Wilton Manors, which is experiencing a tremendous amount of new development.  Increased property prices in Wilton Manors have pushed up prices in Oakland Park and spurred interest in the city's downtown redevelopment plan.

Demographics

2020 census

As of the 2020 United States census, there were 44,229 people, 16,958 households, and 9,030 families residing in the city.

2010 census

As of 2010, there were 20,076 households, out of which 12.8% were vacant. As of 2000, 24.5% had children under the age of 18 living with them, 32.3% were married couples living together, 13.3% had a female householder with no husband present, and 48.6% were non-families. 35.1% of all households were made up of individuals, and 7.4% had someone living alone who was 65 years of age or older.  The average household size was 2.26 and the average family size was 3.00.

2000 census

In 2000, the city the population was spread out, with 20.9% under the age of 18, 9.0% from 18 to 24, 38.7% from 25 to 44, 21.3% from 45 to 64, and 10.2% who were 65 years of age or older.  The median age was 36 years. For every 100 females, there were 109.1 males.  For every 100 females age 18 and over, there were 109.8 males.

In 2000, the median income for a household in the city was $35,493, and the median income for a family was $38,571. Males had a median income of $30,269 versus $25,514 for females. The per capita income for the city was $18,873.  About 13.3% of families and 16.5% of the population were below the poverty line, including 22.1% of those under age 18 and 11.3% of those age 65 or over.

As of 2000, English as a first language comprised 66.52%, while 18.16% spoke Spanish, 6.95% spoke French Creole as theirs, 3.32% spoke Portuguese, 1.99% spoke French, Italian was at 0.64%, and German as a mother tongue made up 0.52% of the population.

As of 2000, Oakland Park was the fifteenth most Brazilian-populated area in the US (tied with several other areas) at 2.1%, and it had the twenty-fifth highest percentage of Haitians in the US, with 7% of the population (tied with Ramapo, New York.)

Also, as of 2000, the North Andrews Gardens section of Oakland Park is the sixty-third most Cuban-populated area in the US at 5.76%, while the rest of Oakland Park had the 113th highest percentage of Cubans with 2.03% of all residents. The North Andrews Gardens section was also the thirty-third most Peruvian-populated area in the US, at 1.51% of the population, as well as having the seventy-fourth highest percentage of Colombians in the US, at 2.03% of all residents.

Neighborhoods

These are the neighborhoods and communities that are officially recognized by the City of Oakland Park.

Government and infrastructure

Oakland Park is represented by 5 City Commissioners who are elected to serve a 4-year term. Commission Members may only serve for 2 consecutive terms. A Commission Member who has served 2 consecutive terms may not run for election for a 2-year period.
The City operates under a commission-manager form of government in which the City Manager is appointed by the City Commission, and serves as the head of the City's administration.
The City Manager's goals are to provide a capable and inspiring leadership for City staff, to make day-to-day decisions that allow for the most effective use of resources, and to operate in a manner that improves the quality of life for Oakland Park's business and residents.
The United States Postal Service operates post offices in Oakland Park, including the Oakland Park Post Office at 3350 NE 12th Avenue, the Fort Lauderdale Main Post Office at 1900 West Oakland Park Boulevard, the North Andrews Annex at 3400 North Andrews Avenue (closed), and the North Ridge Annex at 4350 North Andrews Avenue (closed).

Economy

The movie theater chain Muvico has its headquarters in Oakland Park.

Oakland Park is also home to the Funky Buddha Brewery, a facility that produces beers unique to the South Florida market, its most popular arguably being Hop Gun.

Media

Oakland Park is a part of the Miami-Fort Lauderdale-Hollywood media market, which is the twelfth largest radio market and the seventeenth largest television market in the United States. Its primary daily newspapers are the South Florida Sun-Sentinel and The Miami Herald, and their Spanish language counterparts El Sentinel and El Nuevo Herald.

Libraries 

The Oakland Park Library, officially named the Ethel M. Gordon Oakland Park Library, is a public library in Oakland Park, Florida. It is located at 1298 NE 37th Street, Oakland Park, FL 33334. 

In 1951, Gordon donated her personal book collection and housed the collection in the Oakland Park Women's Clubhouse. Gordon later won a seat on the City Commission after campaigning on the promise to create a municipal library. On February 10, 1958 the City of Oakland Park Library was officially opened. 

On October 16, 2013, the Oakland Park City Commission voted to officially re-name the Library in honor of Ethel M. Gordon.

Education

The city is served by Broward County Public Schools.

Schools in the city limits:
Oakland Park Elementary School – Central and southern Oakland Park
 It is a 1925 school building on the National Register of Historic Places.
Lloyd Estates Elementary School – Southwestern Oakland Park
North Andrews Gardens Elementary School – northern Oakland Park
James S. Rickards Middle School – Serves most of the city
Northeast High School – serves most of the city

Portions are zoned to Floranada (Fort Lauderdale), Oriole (Lauderdale Lakes), Rock Island (Fort Lauderdale), and Wilton Manors elementaries. Portions are zoned to William Dandy (Fort Lauderdale), Lauderdale Lakes, and Sunrise (Fort Lauderdale) middle schools. Portions are zoned to Boyd Anderson High School (Lauderdale Lakes) and Fort Lauderdale High School.

References

External links 

Official website
Oakland Park at City-Data.com

Cities in Broward County, Florida
Cities in Florida